Susan Katharine Hussey, Baroness Hussey of North Bradley,  (née Waldegrave; born 1 May 1939), known as Lady Susan Hussey, is a British noblewoman who served as a Woman of the Bedchamber to Queen Elizabeth II and as a Lady of the Household from September to November 2022 under King Charles III. According to BBC News, Hussey "was a key and trusted figure in the British royal household for decades."

Family
Hussey is the fifth and youngest daughter of the 12th Earl Waldegrave, and Mary Hermione Grenfell (1909–1995). She is the sister of the 13th Earl Waldegrave and the Conservative politician William Waldegrave. Her aunt, Dame Frances Campbell-Preston, was lady-in-waiting to Queen Elizabeth The Queen Mother.

On 25 April 1959, she married Marmaduke Hussey (later Chairman of the Board of Governors of the BBC) and had two children: James Arthur (b. 1961) and Katharine Elizabeth (b. 1964). Her daughter Katharine married Sir Francis Brooke and followed her mother into royal service, as one of the official companions to Queen Camilla.

Royal household
Hussey joined the royal household in 1960, initially helping with royal correspondence, before being promoted to the position of Woman of the Bedchamber, owing to her knowledge of the inner workings of the household. She was a close friend of Queen Elizabeth II, as well as of Queen Margrethe II of Denmark, and often spent time at Balmoral Castle.

During her time as a courtier, Hussey was given the job of helping new arrivals adjust to life in the royal household, such as Diana, Princess of Wales. Another such new arrival whom Hussey was tasked with assisting was Meghan, Duchess of Sussex.

Hussey is a godmother to Diana's first-born son, William, Prince of Wales, and was chosen to accompany Queen Elizabeth at the funeral of Prince Philip.

With other members of the royal household, Hussey attended the state funeral of Queen Elizabeth II on 19 September 2022. Following the Queen's death, she was made a Lady of the Household, along with the late Queen's other ladies-in-waiting, and was responsible for assisting at events held at Buckingham Palace.

Resignation and subsequent  return to royal duties

In her role as a Lady of the Household, she attended a reception hosted by Queen Camilla on 29 November 2022 as part of the Preventing Sexual Violence in Conflict initiative. It was widely reported that Lady Hussey asked Ngozi Fulani "where she came from", this was brought to wider public repute the next day, when Sistah Space charity founder Ngozi Fulani published the conversation (on Twitter) as a transcript of a now undisputed conversation that occurred between them at the event. Once the conversation became public Lady Hussey resigned her position from the royal household and apologised. In the post on Twitter, Fulani said that Hussey had questioned her origins by repeatedly asking where she was "really" from, which Fulani interpreted as racist. Witnesses to the conversation, such as Women's Equality Party leader Mandu Reid, corroborated this account of events.

Buckingham Palace said that "unacceptable and deeply regrettable comments" had been made, and that "the individual concerned would like to express her profound apologies for the hurt caused and has stepped aside". A spokesperson for her godson, William, Prince of Wales, said that "racism has no place in our society". The prime minister, Rishi Sunak, declined to comment on the controversy specifically, but stated that the country had made "incredible" progress in tackling racism, adding that it was "never done" and must continue to be addressed. Some journalists defended her; long-time personal friend of Hussey Petronella Wyatt said, "I can say with authority, however, that Susan Hussey has never knowingly offended anyone in her life. She upholds a clean tradition of honesty and equity ... This morning a mutual friend told me she is 'shattered and heartbroken and will never recover.'" 

On 16 December, Hussey and Fulani met at Buckingham Palace to address the incident, with Hussey offering her "sincere apologies for the comments that were made and the distress they caused". A joint statement was released afterwards, reporting that the meeting was "filled with warmth and understanding" and that Fulani "has accepted this apology and appreciates that no malice was intended".

Hussey had reportedly returned to performing official royal duties by February 2023, representing Princess Anne at a memorial service for Dame Frances Campbell-Preston.

Honours

Having previously been appointed a Commander of the Royal Victorian Order (CVO) in the 1971 New Year Honours, and Dame Commander of the Royal Victorian Order (DCVO) in the 1984 New Year Honours, Hussey was promoted to Dame Grand Cross of the Royal Victorian Order (GCVO) in the 2013 Birthday Honours.

She was also awarded the Queen Elizabeth II Version of the Royal Household Long and Faithful Service Medal with 30-, 40-, 50- and 60-year bars.

In September 2015, she received the Sash of Special Category of the Order of the Aztec Eagle.

In popular culture
Hussey is portrayed by Haydn Gwynne in season 5 of The Crown.

References

1939 births
Living people
Waldegrave family
People from Mendip District
People from Somerset
English people of Cornish descent
English people of Scottish descent
English people of French descent
Dames Grand Cross of the Royal Victorian Order
Daughters of British earls
Spouses of life peers
Hussey of North Bradley
British ladies-in-waiting
Women of the Bedchamber